Archie Giant Series was a comic book title published by Archie Comics from 1954 to 1992.  The book featured an ever revolving subtitle. It began in 1954 as Archie's Christmas Stocking, and continued with this title for six issues. Although the Christmas Stocking title appeared again in later issues, the book began to feature a number of different titles, each with the cover heading Archie Giant Series. Titles included World of Archie, World of Jughead, Katy Keene, Betty and Veronica Summer Spectacular, Sabrina's Christmas Magic and many others.  One additional interesting item about this title is that it twice skipped in its numbering.  Numbering continued up to #35, then skipped to #136.  Again after reaching #251, the title skipped to #452.  It became a regular 32-page book in the mid-1970s while still keeping "Giant" in the title. Finally the title ended in 1992 with #632 and was replaced with quarterly books Archie and Friends, Betty and Veronica Spectacular, and World of Archie.

See also
 List of Archie Comics Publications

Comics magazines published in the United States
Archie Comics titles
1954 comics debuts
1992 comics endings
Romantic comedy comics
Teen comedy comics
Magazines established in 1954
Magazines disestablished in 1992